The Missile Technology Control Regime (MTCR) is a multilateral export control regime. It is an informal political understanding among 35 member states that seek to limit the proliferation of missiles and missile technology. The regime was formed in 1987 by the G-7 industrialized countries. The MTCR seeks to limit the risks of proliferation of weapons of mass destruction (WMD) by controlling exports of goods and technologies that could make a contribution to delivery systems (other than manned aircraft) for such weapons. In this context, the MTCR places particular focus on rockets and unmanned aerial vehicles capable of delivering a payload of at least  to a range of at least  and on equipment, software, and technology for such systems.

The MTCR is not a treaty and does not impose any legally binding obligations on Partners (members). Rather, it is an informal political understanding among states that seek to limit the proliferation of missiles and missile technology.

History
The Missile Technology Control Regime (MTCR) was established in April 1987 by the G7 countries: Canada, France, Germany, Italy, Japan, the United Kingdom, and the United States.

The MTCR applies to exports to members and non-members. An aide-mémoire attached to the agreement says that it does not supersede prior agreements, which NATO members say allows the supply of Category 1 systems between NATO members. An example is the export by the United States of Trident missiles to the United Kingdom for nuclear-weapons delivery.

At the annual meeting in Oslo from 29 June to 2 July 1992, chaired by Sten Lundbo, it was agreed to expand the MTCR's scope to include nonproliferation of unmanned aerial vehicles (UAVs) for weapons of mass destruction. Prohibited materials are divided into two categories, which are outlined in the MTCR Equipment, Software, and Technology Annex. Thirty-five nations are members, with India joining on 27 June 2016.

According to the Arms Control Association, the MTCR has been successful in helping to slow (or stop) several ballistic missile programs: "Argentina, Egypt, and Iraq abandoned their joint Condor II ballistic missile program. Brazil and South Africa also shelved or eliminated missile or space launch vehicle programs. Some former Warsaw Pact countries, such as Poland and the Czech Republic, destroyed their ballistic missiles, in part, to better their chances of joining MTCR." In October 1994, the MTCR member states established a "no undercut" policy: if one member denies the sale of technology to another country, all members must do likewise.

China originally viewed the MTCR as a discriminatory measure by Western governments, which sold sophisticated military aircraft while restricting sales of competing ballistic missiles. It verbally agreed that it would adhere to the MTCR in November 1991, and included the assurance in a letter from its foreign minister in February 1992. China reiterated its pledge in the October 1994 US-China joint statement. In their October 1997 joint statement, the United States and China said that they agreed "to build on the 1994 Joint Statement on Missile Nonproliferation." The Missiles and Missile-related Items and Technologies Export Control List, a formal regulation, was issued in August 2002. The following year, the MTCR chair invited China to participate. China requested to join the MTCR in 2004, but membership was not offered because of concerns about the country's export-control standards.
Israel, Romania and Slovakia have agreed to follow MTCR export rules, although they are not yet members.

The regime has its limitations; member countries have been known to clandestinely violate the rules. Countries which are not MTCR members buy and sell on the global arms market; North Korea is currently viewed as the primary source of ballistic-missile proliferation in the world, and China has supplied ballistic missiles and technology to Pakistan. China supplied DF-3A IRBMs to Saudi Arabia in 1988 before it informally agreed to follow MTCR guidelines. Israel cannot export its Shavit space-launch system due to its non-member MTCR status, although the Clinton administration allowed an import waiver for US companies to buy the Shavit in 1994.

Over 20 countries have ballistic missile systems. The International Code of Conduct against Ballistic Missile Proliferation (ICOC), also known as the Hague Code of Conduct, was established in 2002. The code, which calls for restraint and care in the proliferation of ballistic missile systems capable of delivering weapons of mass destruction, has 119 members. Its mission is similar to the MTCR's, an export group.

India applied for membership in June 2015 with support from Russia, France and the United States, and became a member on 27 June 2016.

Pakistan is not a member of the MTCR. Although it has expressed a desire to join the group, it has not submitted an application. The Pakistani government has pledged to adhere to MTCR guidelines, and analysts believe that the country is doing so.

In 2020, the U.S. government announced that it would reinterpret its implementation of the MTCR to expedite sales of unmanned aerial vehicles (UAVs) to other countries. The revised U.S. policy will reinterpret how the MTCR applies to drones which travel at speeds under , such as the Predator and Reaper drones (made by General Atomics) and the Global Hawk drone (made by Northrop Grumman).

Members
The MTCR has 35 members.

 Argentina, 1993
 Australia, 1990
 Austria, 1991
 Belgium, 1990
 Bulgaria, 2004
 Brazil, 1995
 Canada, 1987
 Czech Republic, 1998
 Denmark, 1990
 Finland, 1991
 France, 1987
 Germany, 1987
 Greece, 1992
 Hungary, 1993
 Iceland, 1993
 India, 2016
 Ireland, 1992
 Italy, 1987
 Japan, 1987
 Luxembourg, 1990
 Netherlands, 1990
 New Zealand, 1991
 Norway, 1990
 Poland, 1997
 Portugal, 1992
 Republic of Korea, 2001
 Russian Federation, 1995
 South Africa, 1995
 Spain, 1990
 Sweden, 1991
 Switzerland, 1992
 Turkey, 1997
 Ukraine, 1998
 United Kingdom, 1987
 United States, 1987

Non-members pledging to adhere to MTCR include:

 China, 2002
 Israel
 Romania
 Slovakia

References

External links
 Missile Technology Control Regime website
 Sarah Chankin-Gould & Ivan Oelrich, "Double-edged shield," Bulletin of the Atomic Scientists, May/June 2005.

Arms control
Guided missiles
G7 summits
Treaties entered into force in 1987